Prince Marie Charles-Henri Hugues Xavier Benoît Michel Edouard Joseph Balthazar de Lobkowicz (born 17 May 1964) is a French nobleman and member of the House of Lobkowicz.

Early life 
Prince Charles-Henri is the third child of four siblings, son of Prince Edouard de Lobkowicz and Princess Marie-Françoise of Bourbon-Parma, proprietor of the château de Boszt in Besson, heir to the Manoir d'Ujezd in Goderville, and to the château de Lignières. His older brother, Prince Edouard-Xavier de Lobkowicz, was murdered in Paris in 1984.

The family lived part of their youth on Avenue Marceau, in the 8th arrondissement of Paris.

He followed his boarding school education in Germany, England, Switzerland, and France while making frequent visits to Lebanon where his parents spent part of the year. He graduated from Duke University in Durham, North Carolina with degrees in art history and political science.

Career 
Archaeologists of Malcoiffée, Sébastien Talour, and Elisabeth Chalmin-Sirop have worked to restore the historic buildings to their former glory for the sake of expanding French historical patrimony.

In addition, Prince Charles-Henri is a cultural ambassador for Chopard and has been linked to numerous celebrities including Katie Holmes and Kate Moss. He also appeared on The Oprah Winfrey Show discussing the duties of being a royal. Prince Charles-Henri also worked in the New York Stock Exchange as a money manager. A white wine has also been named after him.

Charles was an executive producer of the 2018 film The Aspern Papers.

References 

Living people
1964 births
Austrian princes
Czech nobility
Duke University alumni
French film producers
French people of American descent
French people of Austrian descent
French people of Czech descent
French people of Italian descent
French people of Spanish descent
Charles-Henri
Nobility from Paris